The New Caledonian nightjar (Eurostopodus exul) is a poorly known species of nightjar in the family Caprimulgidae.
It is endemic to New Caledonia.

Description
It has silvery-grey plumage with dark blotches and streaks and a blackish crown and dark grey brown 
underparts with a small white throat patch.

Conservation
It is considered possibly extinct, as it is known only from the holotype which was collected in 1939. 
The specimen was of a bird taken in coastal savanna. The possibility of decline in population was probably caused by predation by introduced cats and rats, alongside habitat destruction.

References

New Caledonian nightjar
Birds of New Caledonia
Critically endangered fauna of Oceania
New Caledonian nightjar